In 1730 Thomas Coram approached aristocratic women with a petition to support the establishment of a Foundling Hospital, which he would present to King George II.

The women who signed were of aristocratic backgrounds, and Coram kept a list in his pocket memorandum book, captioned 'An Exact Account when each Lady of Charity Signed their Declaration'. In several cases, he had already approached the women's husbands several years earlier, and been turned away. Their involvement is widely regarded as the gateway to wider support of his philanthropic cause. In an essay in the catalogue of an exhibition celebrating women's roles in the Foundling Hospital, Elizabeth Einberg states that: "Coram could see that securing the approval of a group of right-thinking women, of wives and dowagers at the pinnacle of society would highlight the Christian, virtuous and humanitarian aspects of such an endeavour and make it socially acceptable. In the events, it became not only that, but one of the most fashionable charities of the day."These female signatories are listed here in chronological order of date of their signature:

In 2018 the Foundling Museum held an exhibition to raise awareness of the role of women in founding and running the Foundling Hospital, called "Ladies of Quality and Distinction". By their actions, these women succeeded.

References 

Philanthropic organizations
English women philanthropists
Foundling Hospital
History of women in the United Kingdom